was a town located in Nishiibaraki District, Ibaraki Prefecture, Japan.

In 2003, the town had an estimated population of 22,378 and a density of 256.75 per km². The total area was 87.16 km².

On October 1, 2005, Iwase, the town of Makabe and the village of Yamato (both from Makabe District) were merged to create the city of Sakuragawa.

External links
 Sakuragawa official website 

Dissolved municipalities of Ibaraki Prefecture
Sakuragawa, Ibaraki